Ceriporia is a widely distributed genus of crust fungi.

Taxonomy
The genus was circumscribed by Dutch mycologist Marinus Anton Donk in 1930, with Ceriporia viridans as the type species. The generic name combines the Latin word cera ("wax") and the name Poria.

Molecular phylogenetic analyses have shown that Ceriporia is not monophyletic, despite an earlier study which suggested the contrary. The presence or absence of cystidia is not considered a phylogenetic character in delimiting the species of Ceriporia.

Although traditionally classified in the family Phanerochaetaceae, recent molecular phylogenetic analysis supports the placement of Ceriporia  in the Irpicaceae.

Species

A 2008 estimate placed 22 species in the genus. , Index Fungorum accepts 49 species of Ceriporia. Twenty species occur in China; eighteen species are found in the neotropics.
Ceriporia alachuana (Murrill) Hallenb. (1979) – Dominican Republic
Ceriporia alania Gilb. & Hemmes (2004)
Ceriporia alba M.Pieri & B.Rivoire (1997)
Ceriporia albobrunnea Ryvarden & Iturr. (2003)
Ceriporia albomellea Yuan Yuan, Jia J.Chen, X.H.Ji (2017) – China
Ceriporia amazonica A.M.S.Soares, H.M.P.Sotão & Ryvarden (2014) – Brazil
Ceriporia angulata Gomes-Silva, Ryvarden & Gibertoni (2012) – Brazil
Ceriporia aurantiocarnescens (Henn.) M.Pieri & B.Rivoire (1997)
Ceriporia aurea Ryvarden (2014) – Brazil
Ceriporia bresadolae (Bourdot & Galzin) Donk (1933)
Ceriporia bubalinomarginata B.S.Jia & Y.C.Dai (2013) – China
Ceriporia camaresiana (Bourdot & Galzin) Bondartsev & Singer (1941) – Corsica
Ceriporia citrina M.Mata & Ryvarden (2010) – Costa Rica
Ceriporia crassitunicata Y.C.Dai & Sheng H.Wu (2002)
Ceriporia cystidiata Ryvarden & Iturr. (2003)
Ceriporia davidii (D.A.Reid) M.Pieri & B.Rivoire (1997)
Ceriporia dentipora Ryvarden (2010) – Costa Rica
Ceriporia excelsa S.Lundell ex Parmasto (1959) – Europe
Ceriporia ferrugineocincta  (Murrill) Ryvarden (1980) – Puerto Rico
Ceriporia griseoviolascens M.Pieri & B.Rivoire (1997)
Ceriporia herinkii  Vampola (1996) – Europe
Ceriporia incrustata M.Mata & Ryvarden (2010) – Costa Rica
Ceriporia inflata B.S.Jia & B.K.Cui (2012) – China
Ceriporia jiangxiensis B.S.Jia & B.K.Cui (2012)  – China
Ceriporia lacerata N.Maek., Suhara & R.Kondo (2003)
Ceriporia leptoderma (Berk. & Broome) Ryvarden (1980) – Uganda
Ceriporia mellea (Berk. & Broome) Ryvarden (1978) – Uganda; Zaïre
Ceriporia mellita  (Bourdot & Galzin) Bondartsev & Singer (1941) – Great Britain
Ceriporia merulioidea Ryvarden (2010)
Ceriporia metamorphosa (Fuckel) Ryvarden & Gilb. (1993) – Europe
Ceriporia microspora I.Lindblad & Ryvarden (1999)
Ceriporia nanlingensis B.K.Cui & B.S.Jia (2011) – China
Ceriporia ochracea Ryvarden (2014)
Ceriporia otakou (G.Cunn.) P.K.Buchanan & Ryvarden (1988)
Ceriporia pseudocystidiata  B.S.Jia & Y.C.Dai (2013) – China
Ceriporia purpurea (Fr.) Donk (1971) – Europe
Ceriporia retamoana Rajchenb. (2000)
Ceriporia reticulata (Hoffm.) Domanski (1963) – Europe; United States
Ceriporia rhodella (Fr.) Donk (1933)
Ceriporia rubescens (Petch) Ryvarden (2015)
Ceriporia spissa (Schwein. ex Fr.) Rajchenb. (1983) – Great Britain
Ceriporia straminea Ryvarden (2014)
Ceriporia subpudorina (Pilát) Bondartsev (1953)
Ceriporia subspissa  Aime & Ryvarden (2007) – Guyana
Ceriporia tarda (Berk.) Ginns (1984) – United States; Australia
Ceriporia totara (G.Cunn.) P.K.Buchanan & Ryvarden (1988)
Ceriporia variegata B.S.Jia & Y.C.Dai (2013) – China
Ceriporia vermicularis M.Pieri & B.Rivoire (1997)
Ceriporia viridans (Berk. & Broome) Donk (1933) – Europe
Ceriporia xylostromatoides  (Berk.) Ryvarden (1980)

References

Irpicaceae
Polyporales genera
Taxa described in 1933